The Ministry of Planning oversees the financial policies of the Iraqi Government, responsible for socioeconomic planning and statistics management.

It contains three divisions:
Planning Division
Statistics and Informatics Division
Implementation Monitoring & Evaluation Division

References

External links
 Ministry of Planning

Planning
Planning ministries